Telipna villiersi is a butterfly in the family Lycaenidae. It is found in the Republic of the Congo, Gabon and the western part of the Democratic Republic of the Congo.

References

Butterflies described in 1965
Poritiinae